Stará Huť is a municipality and village in Příbram District in the Central Bohemian Region of the Czech Republic. It has about 1,600 inhabitants.

History
Stará Huť was founded around 1674, originally for the purposes of metallurgy. The name literally means "Old Smelter."

Notable people

Karel Čapek, a Czech writer, spent much time working and relaxing in his local summer residence between 1935 and 1938.

References

External links

Villages in Příbram District